

James B. Macelwane, S.J. (September 28, 1883 – February 15, 1956) was a Jesuit Catholic priest and pioneering American seismologist.

Biography
Father Macelwane was the second of nine children born to Alexander Macelwane, a fisherman and farmer, and Catherine Agnes Carr.

He was on the faculty of Saint Louis University, St. Louis, Missouri (SLU), where he  organized the Jesuit Seismological Service, whose central station is in St. Louis, in 1925.

Macelwane is the namesake of the James B. Macelwane Medal awarded annually by the American Geophysical Union (AGU) and the Macelwane Fellowship awarded by the American Meteorological Society (AMS). He served as President of the AGU from 1953 until his death in 1956. He was elected to the National Academy of Sciences (NAS) in 1944. The geological division of the SLU Department of Earth and Atmospheric Sciences is housed in Macelwane Hall.

Works
 Introduction to Theoretical Seismology
 When the Earth Quakes

See also
 List of Roman Catholic scientist-clerics

References

External links
 Memorial page at Saint Louis University
 James B. Macelwane Manuscript Collection at Saint Louis University

Saint Louis University alumni
Saint Louis University faculty
Saint Louis University physicists
1883 births
1956 deaths
19th-century American Jesuits
20th-century American Jesuits
American Roman Catholic priests
American seismologists
Catholic clergy scientists
Place of birth missing
Place of death missing
Jesuit scientists